Elizabeth Harper may refer to:

Elizabeth Bannister (1757–1849), born Elizabeth Harper, British actress and singer
Class Actress, stage name of Elizabeth Harper, US musician
Dame Elizabeth Harper, New Zealand humanitarian 
Elizabeth Kucinich (née Harper), British-born third wife of United States Congressman Dennis Kucinich
Elizabeth Harper, British evolutionary biologist